Welington Damascena Santos (born 19 February 2001), known as Welington, is a Brazilian professional footballer who plays for São Paulo FC as a left-back.

Career statistics

Honours
São Paulo
Campeonato Paulista: 2021

References

2001 births
Living people
Brazilian footballers
Association football defenders
Campeonato Brasileiro Série A players
São Paulo FC players
Footballers from São Paulo